Kouami is a Togolese film directed by Metonou Do Kokou. It was released in 1972. The 30 minute film was shot in 16mm.

References

External links
 

1972 films
Togolese films